The Lilioideae are a subfamily of monocotyledonous perennial, herbaceous mainly bulbous flowering plants in the lily family, Liliaceae. They are found predominantly in the temperate and colder regions of the Northern Hemisphere, particularly East Asia and North America. The subfamily includes two tribes. They are of economic importance, particularly the lilies and tulips.

Description 
Lilioideae genera are relatively homogeneous and distinct from the other two Liliaceae subfamilies (Calochortoideae and Streptopoideae). They are perennial herbaceous flowering plants that are mainly bulbous (Lilieae) with contractile roots, but may be rhizomatous (Medeoleae). Stems unbranched, leaves with parallel venation. Flowers are large and showy. The embryo sac (megagametophyte) is of the Fritillaria-type (tetrasporic). Capsule septicidal, seeds often flattened, exotesta palisaded or lignified. The seeds of Medeoleae are striate. Chromosome number may be 7 (Medeoleae), 9, or 11–14, with a highly variable length (2.2 - 27 µm).

Taxonomy 
The term was introduced by Amos Eaton in his Botanical Dictionary in 1836. Engler and Prantl included it as one of the eleven subfamilies of Liliaceae. In 1927, Buxbaum's treatment of the subfamily included three  tribes; Lloydieae (Gagea, Lloydia and Szechenya and Giradiella — both now included in Lloydia), Tulipeae: (Erythronium, Tulipa and Eduardoregalia — now part of Tulipa) and Lilieae (Korolkowia, Fritillaria, Notholirion, Cardiocrinum, Nomocharis and Lilium).

In the phylogenetic era, the subfamily Lilioideae has been circumscribed in both a broad (sensu lato, or s.l.) and narrow (sensu stricto, or s.s.) sense. Tamura, and others have defined Lilioideae s.s. (or sensu Tamura) to include only the tribes Tulipeae and Lilieae. However other authorities including the Angiosperm Phylogeny Website (APWeb) define Lilioideae s.l. to also include the Medeoleae (while subsuming the Tulipae into Lilieae). In the s.s. usage, the Medeoleae are treated as a separate subfamily, the Medeoloideae.

Genera 
The subfamily Lilioideae includes ten genera and about 535 species. The largest genera are Gagea (200), Fritillaria (130), Lilium (110), and Tulipa (75 species).

References

Bibliography 

 
 * Tropicos: Lilioideae Eaton 
 
 
 
  In .
 
 
 

 
 

Liliaceae
Monocot subfamilies